Mayo North was a parliamentary constituency represented in Dáil Éireann, the lower house of the Irish parliament or Oireachtas from 1923 to 1969. The method of election was proportional representation by means of the single transferable vote (PR-STV).

History
The constituency was created under the Electoral Act 1923 for the 1923 general election to Dáil Éireann, whose members formed the 4th Dáil.

From 1923 to 1937, Mayo North elected 4 deputies (Teachtaí Dála, commonly known as TDs). Under the Electoral (Revision of Constituencies) Act 1935, this was reduced to 3 with effect from the 1937 general election.

It was abolished under the Electoral (Amendment) Act 1969, when it and Mayo South were replaced by the two new constituencies of Mayo East and Mayo West.

Boundaries 
The constituency covered the county electoral areas of Ballina, Killala and Swinford, in the administrative county of Mayo.

TDs

Elections

1965 general election

1961 general election

1957 general election

1954 general election

1952 by-election 
Following the death of Fianna Fáil TD P. J. Ruttledge, a by-election was held on 26 June 1952. The seat was won by the Fianna Fáil candidate Phelim Calleary.

1951 general election

1948 general election

1944 general election

1943 general election 

Full figures on the fourth and fifth counts are unavailable.

1938 general election 
The number of votes of Jordan on the 4th count is unavailable.

1937 general election

1933 general election

1932 general election

September 1927 general election

June 1927 general election

1925 by-election 
Following the resignation of Cumann na nGaedheal TD Joseph McGrath, a by-election was held on 11 March 1925. The seat was won by the Cumann na nGaedheal candidate Michael Tierney.

1924 by-election 
Following the disqualification of Cumann na nGaedheal TD Henry Coyle, a by-election was held on 18 November 1924. The seat was won by the Republican candidate John Madden.

1923 general election

See also
Dáil constituencies
Politics of the Republic of Ireland
Historic Dáil constituencies
Elections in the Republic of Ireland

References

External links
Oireachtas Members Database

Historic constituencies in County Mayo
Dáil constituencies in the Republic of Ireland (historic)
1923 establishments in Ireland
1969 disestablishments in Ireland
Constituencies established in 1923
Constituencies disestablished in 1969